Jerusalem mixed grill (me'orav Yerushalmi) is a grilled meat dish considered a specialty of Jerusalem. It consists of chicken hearts, spleens and liver mixed with bits of lamb cooked on a flat grill, seasoned with onion, garlic, black pepper, cumin, turmeric, olive oil and coriander.

The dish is said to have been invented at the Mahane Yehuda Market, with various restaurants claiming to be the originators.

In 2009, Israeli chefs created a giant portion that weighed in at 440 pounds (200 kilos), winning a Guinness world record for the largest Jerusalem mixed grill. They also prepared the world's smallest dish: Jerusalem mixed grill in a pita the size of a coin.

According to the late Haaretz food critic Daniel Rogov, world-renowned chefs have pleaded with one of the steakhouses, Sima, for the recipe which includes a secret ingredient described as "Georgian pepper".

A variation of the dish may have the meorav yerushalmi thinly chopped and then rolled into a phyllo shaped cigars which is then fried, it is common to serve Meorav Yerushalmi that way in weddings.

See also
 
 
 Israeli cuisine
 Mixed grill
 List of meat dishes
 Jewish cuisine
 Culture of Israel
 Israeli inventions and discoveries

References

Offal
Meat dishes
Barbecue
Israeli cuisine
Culture of Jerusalem
Jewish cuisine
Middle Eastern grilled meats
Street food
Chicken dishes
National dishes